Shad Gregory Moss (born March 9, 1987), better known by his stage name Bow Wow (formerly Lil' Bow Wow), is an American rapper and actor. His career began upon being discovered by rapper Snoop Dogg in the late 1990s, eventually being brought to record producer Jermaine Dupri and signed to So So Def Recordings. As Lil' Bow Wow, he released his first album at age 13, Beware of Dog, in 2000, which was followed by Doggy Bag a year later.

In 2003, Bow Wow released his third album Unleashed, which was the first album released after dropping the "Lil'" from his stage name, and the first not to be released by So So Def. His next album, Wanted (2005), spawned his two highest-charting singles, "Let Me Hold You" (featuring Omarion) and "Like You" (featuring Ciara). In September 2015, Bow Wow signed a management deal with Puff Daddy's Bad Boy Records.

Bow Wow made his first movie appearance in the 2002 movie All About the Benjamins as a cameo. In the same year, Bow Wow made his debut as the lead role in Like Mike. He later began to undertake lead roles in movies, such as Johnson Family Vacation in 2004 and Roll Bounce in 2005. He also played a supporting role in the film The Fast and the Furious: Tokyo Drift in 2006, a character he reprised in F9 (2021). Bow Wow also appeared in five episodes of the television series Entourage, and starred as Brody Nelson in CSI: Cyber until the show's cancellation in 2016.

Life and career

1987–2001: Early life and Beware of Dog 
Bow Wow was born Shad Gregory Moss in Columbus, Ohio, the son of Teresa Rena Caldwell (née Jones) and Alfonso Preston Moss. At age three, he became interested in rap. Under the moniker "Kid Gangsta", he began rapping recreationally at age six; he was also a fan of N.W.A at that age. In 1993, he performed at a concert in Los Angeles, and was noticed by rapper Snoop Dogg, who subsequently gave him a stage name, "Lil' Bow Wow". He then appeared on the Doggystyle album on the track, "Gz and Hustlas", and on The Arsenio Hall Show in late 1993. He also appeared in the "Gin and Juice" music video. Furthermore, he was supposed to appear on the Murder Was the Case soundtrack with the song "After 3", featuring Kurupt, Jewell, and CPO Boss Hogg, but it remained in the vault until the early 2010s.

In 1998, at the age of eleven, Bow Wow met record producer Jermaine Dupri, who helped shape his career. In 1999, the soundtrack to the movie Wild Wild West featured his song "Stick Up" with Dupri. At the age of 13, in 2000, he debuted with the album Beware of Dog under the stage name Lil' Bow Wow. Its debut single was "Bounce with Me", which featured R&B girl group Xscape. The album also included "Bow Wow (That's My Name)" featuring Snoop Dogg, which topped the rap chart, "Puppy Love", and "Ghetto Girls". The Recording Industry Association of America certified Beware of Dog double platinum on March 5, 2001, signifying sales of two million copies. In a 2009 interview, the rapper claimed that the album had sold over 3 million copies since its release.

2002: Doggy Bag, Like Mike and name change 

In 2002, his second album Doggy Bag was released with singles "Take Ya Home" which peaked at #72 on the Hot 100 and #21 on the Hot R&B/Hip-Hop Songs chart, and "Thank You" with Jagged Edge, #1 on the R&B chart. Doggy Bag peaked at #11 on the Billboard 200 and #2 on the Top R&B/Hip Hop Albums chart and was certified platinum. Lil' Bow Wow performed the track "Basketball" for the soundtrack of his film Like Mike; that song peaked at #1 on the R&B and #25 on the rap chart.

Bow Wow dropped the "Lil'" from his stage name in April 2002; he told MTV News: "I changed my name because I'm getting older now and it's too many Lil's. All these Lil' rappers, I'm just kind of getting real irritated by it. I said, 'You know what? Drop the Lil'. Forget it. I'm Bow Wow. Besides, I'm growing up, I'm not little anymore. [I just decided that] two weeks ago. I really got irritable. It's all these Lil' cats, forget it. I'm Bow Wow now. Everything is just 'Bow Wow,' no 'Lil' Bow Wow.'"

2003–06: Unleashed, Wanted and The Price of Fame 
The first album released under his new name was Unleashed in 2003. Its first single was "Let's Get Down" featuring Birdman, the founder of Cash Money Records, which reached #14 on the Hot 100 and #6 on the Hot Rap Tracks charts. The second single was then released, "My Baby", featuring Jagged Edge. Unlike his previous albums, this one was not produced under the mentorship of Jermaine Dupri. Guest appearances include Jagged Edge, Birdman, Mario, and Amerie. Unleashed was certified gold on September 25, 2003. Bow Wow appeared on the remix of JoJo's single "Baby It's You" in 2004.

Wanted was released in 2005. Its first single was "Let Me Hold You", featuring Omarion, and peaked at #1 on the rap chart and #4 on the Hot 100. The next single, "Like You", featuring Ciara, coincided with the beginning of Bow Wow's relationship with the singer. "Fresh Azimiz", featured J-Kwon and Jermaine Dupri, followed and peaked at #23 on the Hot 100 and #6 on the Hot Rap Tracks chart. The album was certified platinum. At the time of the album's release, Bow Wow was managed by Positive Management. He also appeared on the remix of Dem Franchize Boyz' "I Think They Like Me", which peaked at #15 on the Hot 100 and #1 on the Hot Rap Tracks. Bow Wow ended his relationship with Ciara in 2006.

In 2006, The Price of Fame was released with the lead single "Shortie Like Mine", featuring Chris Brown, peaking at #9 on the Hot 100 and #1 on the Hot Rap Tracks. "Outta My System", which featured T-Pain, reflected on Bow Wow's break-up with Ciara. It peaked at #22 on the Hot 100 and #2 on the Rap chart. The Price of Fame was certified gold.

2007–09: Face Off and New Jack City II 
Bow Wow and Omarion released a collaborative album on December 11, 2007, Face Off. The first single was "Girlfriend", which peaked at #33 on the Hot 100. The second single was "Hey Baby (Jump Off)". He released a mixtape title Half Man, Half Dog Vol. 1 that year. Half Man, Half Dog Vol. 2 was released as a sequel to the mixtape in February 2009. New Jack City II, his sixth album, was released in March 2009 was his first album to include a Parental Advisory: Steven Roberts of MTV News observed that this album explored "the influence of crack cocaine in inner-city communities", and featured such guests as T.I.

Three promo singles were released in late 2008: "Marco Polo" featuring Soulja Boy, "Big Girls", and "Roc The Mic". The first official single, "You Can Get It All" featuring Johntá Austin, samples TLC's "Baby-Baby-Baby" and peaked at #55 on the Hot 100 and #9 on the Hot Rap Tracks. On July 4, 2009, his new song "I Know I'm The Shit" off his DJ Drama-hosted mixtape, makes a references working on his new album Underrated and that it is already in production. On August 16, Bow Wow announced his signing to Cash Money Records, joining an all-star roster that already includes Nicki Minaj, Drake, Lil Wayne and Birdman, among others.

2010–present 
Bow Wow planned to release his new then-titled album Underrated on Cash Money Records, but the record underwent a number of delays and, in mid-November 2011, Bow Wow announced on his blog that the record wouldn't be out before 2012. The album was intended to feature Birdman, Boyz II Men, Chris Brown, DJ Khaled, Fabolous, Game, Lil Wayne, Lloyd Banks, Meek Mill, Nas, Nelly, Sean Kingston, Snoop Dogg, DMX, Styles P and Talib Kweli. The first promo single being "For My Hood", featuring DJ Khaled & Sean Kingston.

On November 1, 2010, Bow Wow released his first promotional single from the album entitled "Ain't Thinkin' 'Bout You" featuring Chris Brown. The music video was a success on 106 & Park and made the countdown in just one day. Two weeks later, it peaked at #1 on the show's charts and remained #1 for three days. On June 2, 2011, a song from his album called "I'm Da Man", which features Chris Brown, was leaked and wasn't the first official single from the album. On October 24, 2011, Bow Wow released the single entitled "Sweat" featuring Lil Wayne, and though it was thought to be the first official single from the album, it was also dubbed by Bow Wow as a promotional single.

On May 18, 2012, after several delays, Bow Wow released the first single from the album titled "Better" featuring T-Pain. The music video for the song was directed by Bow Wow's personal cameraman Rico Da Crook and was a success on 106 & Park and made it to the top of the countdown. On June 26, 2012, Bow Wow released the second single from the album titled "We In Da Club" and was produced by DJ Mustard. The song went nowhere on any billboard charts, but the video was also another success on 106 & Park making it to the top of the countdown. The third single scheduled from the album was intended to feature Miguel that was titled "Right Now". Later, there was an announcement that Universal Republic Records was going defunct; all of the artists on the roster that were moved from the label, including Bow Wow, were moved to Republic Records, making the label itself revived.

On August 10, 2013, via his official YouTube page, Bow Wow stated the reason that Underrated had been delayed was the result of raising his daughter and waiting until he was more mature; he also stated he planned on working on and releasing the album after he turned 28. On June 24, 2014, Bow Wow announced via Instagram that after the 2014 BET Awards, he was going by his real name Shad Moss, claiming that he made a lot of history as Bow Wow and that it was now time for "the next chapter and challenge". He stated that "Bow Wow" no longer fit with his new personality as he was now a father, host, and actor, and he had matured from what he had been early on in his life.

In May 2015, with his long-delayed album with Cash Money still without a release date, Bow Wow announced that he had amicably parted ways with Cash Money Records so he could move on with his music career. He said, "I wanna dictate when my music come out. I'm tired of going to the studio to make records and then I listen to them. 'Cuz then they get old. Then when y'all ask for new music I don't wanna hear it 'cuz I've been listening to it for two or three months. I just can't be held up up by nobody. It's as simple as that. I got a daughter. I got a family I gotta provide for."

On September 27, 2015, Bow Wow signed to Puff Daddy's record label Bad Boy Records. He then named the members of his new management team and finished the post by writing, "Making money won't be the issue. Figuring out where to keep it all is another story!"

On August 7, 2016, Bow Wow officially announced that he is retiring from rapping and will release one more album, titled NYLTH, which was initially tentatively scheduled for release in 2017. As of March 2023 it has not come out.

Prior to his final album release, Bow Wow and Soulja Boy released a joint retail mixtape titled Ignorant Shit on October 25, 2016.

In 2020, Bow Wow competed on the third season of The Masked Singer as "Frog". He finished in third place.

Other ventures

Acting career 
Bow Wow has made guest appearances on Brandy's TV sitcom, Moesha, as well as The Steve Harvey Show and Brothers Garcia. He made his acting debut in the film Like Mike which was released on July 3, 2002, in which he starred as a young orphan who gets a shot at playing in the NBA. Before Like Mike he made cameos in All About The Benjamins and Carmen: A Hip Hopera. Bow Wow also co-starred with Cedric the Entertainer, Vanessa L. Williams, and Solange Knowles in Johnson Family Vacation. Since the success of Like Mike, Bow Wow has starred in several Hollywood films, including Roll Bounce, The Fast and the Furious: Tokyo Drift and Hurricane Season.

He has also made guest appearances on Smallville and Ugly Betty. He was part of the cast of the fifth season of HBO's Entourage, playing Charlie an up-and-coming comedian, and Eric Murphy's newest client. He starred in a 2010 comedy film, Lottery Ticket, with Ice Cube. He is working on a documentary on his life titled Who Is Shad Moss?; Bow Wow stated that the documentary goes all the way back to when he was on Death Row Records, and it was released in 2011.

Bow Wow starred in the film version of Madea's Big Happy Family, released in April 2011. In August 2014, Bow Wow announced that he would star in a CSI spinoff titled CSI: Cyber. In 2021, he reprised his role as Twinkie in F9.

BET's 106 & Park 
On October 1, 2013, it was confirmed that Bow Wow was chosen to host for BET's 106 & Park after former hosts Terrence J and Rocsi retired from the show, it was seen in over 85 million homes in the U.S., Canada, Japan, United Kingdom, Africa, the Caribbean, and Germany until its cancellation in 2014.

RnB Friday Nights 
In 2016, Bow Wow began hosting a nighttime edition of the Australian Hit Network's radio show RnB Fridays, titled RnB Friday Nights.

Legal issues 
On March 28, 2012, it was announced that Bow Wow was ordered by a court to pay $3,000 a month in child support.

On October 2, 2012, Bow Wow claimed he was broke and only making $4,000 a month and only had $1,500 in his checking account. However, the next day he signed on to be one of the four new co-hosts of BET's 106 & Park. Later on he would address this by saying:

One thing about me, I'm a smart guy. Very smart. Things that I do, are for reasons. Things that I don't do are for reasons. So for myself, I'm comfortable, very comfortable. For me, it's all about the work. But as far as rumors, those are people's opinions -- until you see me on a corner with a cardboard box saying I'll tap dance for food or canned goods, then you can say that [I'm broke].

On February 2, 2019, Bow Wow was arrested in Atlanta, Georgia, for battery after a fight with a woman. At the time of arrest, both suffered minor injuries and it was unclear who the aggressor was, so both parties were charged. They were both taken to the Fulton County Jail, but Moss was released from jail Saturday afternoon after he being held on $8,000 signature bond.

Personal life 
His family supported him through his choice of music as a career. Bow Wow lives in Atlanta, Georgia, along with his mother. Bow Wow has a daughter Shai Moss (born April 27, 2011) with Joie Chavis. Bow Wow was formerly engaged to Erica Mena.

Politics 
In October 2008, for the U.S. presidential election, Bow Wow led a 15-city "Walk Across America" event to register new voters. In 2014, during a charity flag football game organized by Chris Brown, Bow Wow participated in a celebrity tribute to Ferguson, Missouri, police-shooting victim Michael Brown.

In 2016, Bow Wow was involved in a controversy on Twitter when he told his followers that he had decided not to vote in the presidential election that year. In response to a suggestion that refusing to vote dishonors the struggle for civil rights in the United States, Moss said that he did not identify with the fight for civil rights because his heritage was "mixed" and not exclusively black.

On March 15, 2017, Bow Wow, responding to President Donald Trump's criticism of Snoop Dogg's music video for "Lavender (Nightfall Remix)", sent a tweet to Trump in which he threatened to "pimp your wife and make her work for us". In less than 24 hours, Bow Wow deleted the offending tweet.

Bow Wow challenge 
In 2017, a new photo challenge went viral over social media, called "Bow Wow Challenge". It all started from the Bow Wow post supposedly portraying his private jet travel lifestyle, only to turn out as fake, since the photo used was actually taken from the MIA VIP Transportation website and was a stock photograph. The challenge gained major popularity from people sharing their misleading photos tagged as "bowwowchallenge".

Controversy 
Bow Wow received criticism for performing maskless at Cle Houston nightclub in Houston, Texas, on January 15, 2021, during the COVID-19 pandemic, in front of an apparently maskless crowd. Bow Wow responded to the criticism by stating that he appeared for his friend's birthday and only performed one song ("Like You"); and that he was not paid for his performance. He also stated that he put on his mask after his performance.

Discography

Studio albums 
 Beware of Dog (2000)
 Doggy Bag (2001)
 Unleashed (2003)
 Wanted (2005)
 The Price of Fame (2006)
 New Jack City II (2009)
 Before 30 (TBA)

Collaboration albums
 Face Off (with Omarion) (2007)

Filmography

Film

Television

Awards and nominations 
BET Awards
2001, Viewer's Choice "Bow Wow (That's My Name)" (Won)
2006, Best Collaboration "Like You" (with Ciara) (Nominated)
2007, Viewer's Choice "Shortie Like Mine" (with Chris Brown) (Nominated)

Billboard Music Awards
2001, Rap Single of the Year "Bow Wow (That's My Name)" (Won)

Billboard R&B/Hip-Hop Awards
2004, Top R&B/Hip-Hop Singles – Sales "Let's Get Down" (with Baby) (Nominated)
2006, Hot Rap Track "Like You" (with Ciara) (Nominated)

Black Reel Awards
2003, Best Breakthrough Performance – Viewer's Choice: Like Mike (Nominated)

MTV Video Music Awards Japan
2006, Best Collaboration "Let Me Hold You" (with Omarion) (Nominated)

NAACP Image Awards
2008, Outstanding Duo or Group (with Omarion) (Nominated)

Nickelodeon Kids' Choice Awards
2001, Favorite Male Singer (Won)
2006, Favorite Male Singer (Nominated)
2008, Favorite Male Singer (Nominated)

Soul Train Music Awards
2001, Best R&B/Soul or Rap New Artist "Bounce with Me" (with Xscape) (Nominated)

Teen Choice Awards
2007, Choice Music: Male Artist (Nominated)
2008, Choice Music: R&B Track "Hey Baby (Jump Off)" (with Omarion) (Nominated)
2009, Choice Music: Rap Artist (Nominated)

Vibe Awards
2005, Coolest Collabo "Like You" (with Ciara) (Nominated)

Young Artist Awards
2003, Best Performance in a Feature Film – Leading Young Actor: Like Mike (Nominated)

Notes

References

External links 

African-American male rappers
1987 births
Living people
African-American television hosts
American male child actors
American male film actors
Bad Boy Records artists
Cash Money Records artists
Death Row Records artists
Male actors from Columbus, Ohio
Midwest hip hop musicians
Rappers from Columbus, Ohio
So So Def Recordings artists
20th-century American male actors
20th-century American musicians
21st-century American male actors
21st-century American rappers
20th-century American male musicians
21st-century American male singers
21st-century American singers
African-American male actors
People charged with battery